Sarab-e Tajar (also Romanized as Sarāb-e Ţajar) is a village in Samen Rural District, Samen District, Malayer County, Hamadan Province, Iran. At the 2006 census, its population was 61, in 21 families.

References 

Populated places in Malayer County